This article lists important figures and events in the public affairs of British Malaya during the year 1938, together with births and deaths of prominent Malayans.

Incumbent political figures

Central level 
 Governor of Federated of Malay States :
 Shenton Whitelegge Thomas
 Federal Secretaries of the Federated of Malay States :
 Christopher Dominic Ahearne
 Governor of Straits Settlements :
 Shenton Whitelegge Thomas

State level 
  Perlis :
 Raja of Perlis : Syed Alwi Syed Saffi Jamalullail
  Johore :
 Sultan of Johor : Sultan Ibrahim Al-Masyhur
  Kedah :
 Sultan of Kedah : Abdul Hamid Halim Shah
  Kelantan :
 Sultan of Kelantan : Sultan Ismail Sultan Muhammad IV
  Trengganu :
 Sultan of Trengganu : Sulaiman Badrul Alam Shah
  Selangor :
 British Residents of Selangor : Stanley Wilson Jones 
 Sultan of Selangor : Sultan Sir Hishamuddin Alam Shah Al-Haj 
  Penang :
 Monarchs : King George VI
 Residents-Councillors :  Arthur Mitchell Goodman
  Malacca :
 Monarchs : King George VI
 Residents-Councillors :
  Negri Sembilan :
 British Residents of Negri Sembilan : Gordon Lupton Ham 
 Yang di-Pertuan Besar of Negri Sembilan : Tuanku Abdul Rahman ibni Almarhum Tuanku Muhammad 
   Pahang :
 British Residents of Pahang : C. C. Brown
 Sultan of Pahang : Sultan Abu Bakar
  Perak :
 British Residents of Perak : G. E. Cater 
 Sultan of Perak :
 Sultan Iskandar Shah (until unknown date)
 Sultan Abdul Aziz Al-Mutasim Billah Shah (from unknown date)

Events 
 Unknown date – Kesatuan Melayu Muda was established (dissolved in 1945).

Births
 4 January – Mohamed Rahmat – Politician (died 2010)
 1 April – Ananda Krishnan – Businessman and billionaire
 4 April – Naaman bin Haji Mohd Rawi – Poet
 15 April – Abdul Rahman Abbas – Politician
 1 May - Hamid Bin Mohamed Isa (died 2020)
 3 June – Ooi Eow Jin – Composer
 10 June – Abdul Aziz Shamsuddin – Politician
 10 July – M. Daud Kilau – Singer
 26 August – Dayang Sofia – Actress
 8 September – Kuswadinata – Actor (died 2013)
 19 September – Kassim Masdor – Composer (died 2014)
 11 November – Abdul Rahman bin Abdul Hamid – 9th Chief Commander of Malaysian Armed Forces
 11 November – Daim Zainuddin – Politician
 6 December – Murphy Nicholas Xavier Pakiam – Chief Bishop of Roman Catholic Archdiocese of Kuala Lumpur

Deaths 
 31 March – Sultan Sir Alaeddin Sulaiman Shah, fifth Sultan of Selangor (1898-1938)

See also
 1938
 1937 in Malaya
 1939 in Malaya
 History of Malaysia

References

1930s in British Malaya
Malaya